The 2021 Nippon Professional Baseball season was the 72nd season of professional baseball in Japan since Nippon Professional Baseball (NPB) was reorganized in 1950. There were 12 NPB teams, split evenly between the Central League and Pacific League.

Following the All-Star Series held on 16–17 July, the regular season went on hiatus in preparation for the 2020 Summer Olympics baseball tournament. The season resumed on 13 August. In the postseason, the Tokyo Yakult Swallows defeated the Orix Buffaloes in the Japan Series.

Regular season standings

Interleague

Climax Series

First stage

Central League

Pacific League

Final Stage
The series started with a 1–0 advantage for the first-placed team.

Central League

Pacific League

Japan Series

League leaders

Central League

Pacific League

See also
2021 in baseball
2021 Major League Baseball season
2021 KBO League season
2021 Chinese Professional Baseball League season
Impact of the COVID-19 pandemic on sports

References

 
Nippon Professional Baseball season
Nippon Professional Baseball season
Nippon Professional Baseball, 2021